Neogenesis is a genus of moths of the family Crambidae. It contains only one species, Neogenesis flaviplagialis, which is found in Papua New Guinea.

References

Natural History Museum Lepidoptera genus database

Odontiinae
Crambidae genera
Taxa named by George Hampson